The 1991 Puerto Rico Open was a women's tennis tournament played on outdoor hard courts at the Hyatt Regency Cerromar Hotel in San Juan in Puerto Rico that was part of the Tier IV category of the 1991 WTA Tour. It was the ninth edition of the tournament and was held from October 21 through October 27, 1991. Second-seeded Julie Halard won the singles title and earned $27,000 first-prize money.

Finals

Singles

 Julie Halard defeated  Amanda Coetzer 7–5, 7–5
 It was Halard's 1st singles title of her career.

Doubles

 Rika Hiraki /  Florencia Labat defeated  Sabine Appelmans /  Camille Benjamin 6–3, 6–3

References

External links
 ITF tournament edition details
 Tournament draws

Puerto Rico Open
Puerto Rico Open (tennis)
Puerto Rico Open, 1991